Obura-Wonenara District is a district of the Eastern Highlands Province in Papua New Guinea. Its capital is Aiyura.

Politics
In 2007 national elections, their newly elected MP was John Boito (on 2011 August 9 when Peter O'Neill took office from Grand Chief Sir Micheal Somare (due to Somare's illness) as the interim PM of Papua New Guinea, he (Boito) became the 9th Police Minister of Papua New Guinea government for 10 months before the elections), who is the son of former Kainantu MP late Sir Barry Holloway. He served the people of Obura-Wonenara for five years. However, in the 2012 national general elections, he lost the seat to Mehrra Minne Kipefa. He is still fighting in court over his loss to Kipefa.

References

Districts of Eastern Highlands Province